The 2012 American Le Mans Series season was a multi-event auto racing championship for sports racing cars which conform to the technical regulations laid out by the International Motor Sports Association for the American Le Mans Series. It was the fourteenth  season of the American Le Mans Series, and the 42nd season overall of the IMSA GT Championship. The season began with the 60th annual 12 Hours of Sebring on March 14–17, and covered ten events.

Calendar

On September 30, 2011, ALMS president Scott Atherton announced an eleven race schedule for 2012. All nine of the events on the 2011 race schedule are carried over, while two new events are planned but not yet announced. Atherton stated three different venues are vying for the two calendar spots. One of the two new events was later removed from the calendar. The calendar will also share the 12 Hours of Sebring with the successor to the Intercontinental Le Mans Cup, the FIA World Endurance Championship, while the Petit Le Mans will count as the final round of the European Le Mans Series. It was also announced that four events would be televised live, while the rest would be streamed live on ESPN3 and televised on a tape delay the following day. All tape-delayed events were broadcast on ESPN, and began approximately one hour into the race.

On January 16, the ninth round was announced to take place at Virginia International Raceway on the Full Course layout. It will be both the first visit by ALMS to Virginia, as well as the first competition held on this layout.

Entry list

Team announcements
On November 11, 2011, it was announced that Rolex Sports Car Series team Dempsey Racing, owned by Hollywood actor/driver Patrick Dempsey and driver Joe Foster, and Silicon Tech Racing (STR), owned by racer Henri Richard, would partner, creating Silicon Tech/Dempsey Racing, to campaign an Oreca FLM09 in the LMP Challenge class for the 2012 season. Later in March, Dempsey announced that they will be fielding an LMP2 car in the 2012 ALMS season.
Aston Martin Racing will be returning to GT for the 2012 season after fielding a prototype for several years. In addition to the 12 Hours of Sebring for the WEC, AMR will also participate in the Long Beach and Monterey rounds to prepare for the 24 Hours of Le Mans.
Lotus will also be fielding a team with Alex Job Racing.
SRT Motorsports will be fielding a two-car factory backed GTE effort in a Riley Technologies developed Dodge Viper. Drivers include Kuno Wittmer, Dominik Farnbacher, Tommy Kendall and Marc Goossens. The car has received a waiver from ACO as its 8.4L V10 engine is above the maximum displacement of 5.5L allowed by the rules. The team will debut the cars at the Mid-Ohio round.
Libra Racing will enter a Radical SR10 using a Roush-Yates Ford Ecoboost V6 into P2 from Laguna Seca onward.

Results and standings
Overall winners in bold.

Championships
Points were awarded to the top ten cars and drivers which complete at least 70% of their class winner's distance. Teams with multiple entries only score the points of their highest finishing entry in each race. Drivers were required to drive a minimum of 45 minutes to earn points, except for the Long Beach event which required only 30 minutes.  Drivers are required to complete a particular amount of the minimum number of laps in order to earn points. The number of laps vary depending on the course size.

Team championships
Teams with full season entries are awarded points in the team championships.  Teams which participated in a partial season or on a race-by-race basis are not included in these championships.

As long as they compete full season and comply with ACO regulations, the top P1, P2 and GT team at the end of the season receive an automatic entry to the 2013 24 Hours of Le Mans.

P1 standings

P2 standings

PC standings

All teams utilize the Oreca FLM09 chassis with Chevrolet LS3 engine.

GT standings

GTC standings

All teams utilize variations of the Porsche 997 GT3 Cup.

Note: the #11 JDX Racing car won the Mid-Ohio round but driver Tim Pappas failed to meet the minimum driving time requirement. JDX was allowed to keep their "win" but the first place points and prize money went to the #66 TRG car for that race.

Driver championships
Drivers who participated in races but failed to score points over the course of the season are not listed.

P1 standings

P2 standings

PC standings
Drivers in the PC category are allowed to drive for more than one car during an event.  If a driver is in each car for a minimum of two hours each, he is allowed to score the points from whichever car he chooses.

GT standings

GTC standings

References

American Le Mans Series seasons
 
American Le Mans Series
American Le Mans Series